"Honey I Dare You" is a song recorded by American country music group Southern Pacific. It was released in January 1989 as the third single from the album Zuma.  The song reached number 5 on the Billboard Hot Country Singles & Tracks chart. The song was written by David Jenkins, Stu Cook, John McFee, Dave Gibson, and Craig Karp.

Content
Band members David Jenkins, Stu Cook, and John McFee wrote the song with Nashville songwriters Dave Gibson and Craig Karp. The song is composed in the key of E major, with a modulation to F major in the last verse.

Chart performance

Year-end charts

References

1989 singles
Southern Pacific (band) songs
Song recordings produced by Jim Ed Norman
Songs written by John McFee
Songs written by Stu Cook
Warner Records singles
1988 songs
Songs written by David Jenkins (musician)
Songs written by Dave Gibson (American songwriter)